Village Rockstars is a 2017 Indian Assamese language coming-of-age drama film written, edited, co-produced and directed by Rima Das, who is a self-taught filmmaker. The story follows a 10-year-old girl who befriends a group of boys and dreams of becoming a rock star.

The film premiered at the 2017 Toronto International Film Festival (TIFF). More significantly, it received the Best Feature Film ‘Swarna Kamal’ award at the 65th National Film Awards, which were declared in New Delhi on 13 April 2018. Village Rockstars also won awards in three other categories: Best Child Artist, Best Location Sound Recordist and Best Editing. It was selected as India's official entry to the 91st Academy Awards, but it was not nominated for top nine films from a total of 87.

Plot summary
Dhunu is the protagonist amidst a group of real village rock stars. Growing up in hardship, she cherished aspiration of having her own rock band. Her life although engulfed by hostile natural calamities doesn't bar her from dreaming of owning a real guitar.

Ten-year-old Dhunu (Bhanita Das) lives in Kalardiya village near Chaygaon in Assam, India with her widowed mother (Basanti Das) and elder brother Manabendra (Manabendra Das). While helping her mother sell snacks at a local event, she becomes mesmerized by a band that's performing there. The part that's so delightfully hokey: the boys belt out their hits with musical instruments made of styrofoam. She proceeds to copy them, carving a guitar.

Impressionable and tenacious at the same time, Dhunu reads a comic book and decides she wants to form a band playing real instruments. Rupee by rupee, she begins to save for the guitar. She reads an article in a scrap newspaper and decides that positive thinking can make the possession of the guitar materialize. But as floods destroy the family's crops, Dhunu must choose her priorities.

Cast 
 Bhanita Das as Dhunu 
 Basanti Das as Dhunu's mother
 Manabendra Das as Dhunu's elder brother
 Boloram Das
 Rinku Dast 
 Bishnu Kalita

Production
The film was entirely shot in Das's home village of Kalardiya in Lower Assam, where her family played much of the cast, including her cousin Bhanita Das as the lead role of Dhunu. The film took nearly four years to make. The initial idea for the film was inspired by an event during the post-production of Rima Das's first film, Antardrishti (Man with the Binoculars), when she came across a group of village children playing imaginary instruments to a song on the radio. Rima Das served as the director, producer, writer, editor and cinematographer for Village Rockstars (with assistance from her cousin, Mallika Das), making the film using a Canon 5D camera and one lens. She bought this camera by selling gold jewelry and raising a loan. Speaking on the no-budget nature of the production of the film, Rima Das said, "I shot this film without any crew and cast of the film wasn't trained in acting, so the process to make this film was hard and challenging, but I think it is possible if you have belief in yourself."

Critical reception

Village Rockstars won the Film Critics Circle of India Award for the Best Indian Film of 2017. Jury member Dalton L declared it "a milestone film of sorts", adding, "Village Rockstars epitomises the trials and tribulations, and heralds the coming of age, of a filmmaker, of her protagonist, and of the indie film movement in India". Jury member Priyanka Dasgupta said, "Rima Das’ film is a lyrical montage of life and times in contemporary rural India. It subtly draws attention to complex gender issues – sometimes even subverting the conventional gender norms – without ever getting preachy. Bhanita Das – the pint-sized fiery ball of lovable energy – is endearingly natural. But just when one fears that the film might become schmaltzy, the film-maker takes control. The lens speaks volumes, sometimes conveying more than the dialogues. Such a work by a first-time director holds a lot of promise for Indian cinema". Jury member Premchand called it "a women’s journey into the heart of the matter." Saibal Chatterjee, a founder member of the Society, gave the film a five-star rating, and says in his review, "A masterwork is usually the result of strict adherence to artistic and functional rules. Village Rockstars respects none: it dons a raw, innocent cloak and exudes a degree of purity that deliberate craft can never bestow on a film... The film stands for something that is always under threat: the courage to ignore the reality that life is exceedingly difficult for cinema that is made on the margins of a giant production machinery and recognize that there always are ways out for those who revel in battling the odds, no matter how daunting, and overcoming them."

Maggie Lee says in her review for Variety, "By focusing on tween characters, the picture evokes that freewheeling stage when gender roles are still blurry in the friendships between boys and girls. Then as suddenly as a monsoon, Dhunu’s first period arrives. The rituals held to initiate her into womanhood — making her wear a sari, segregating her from the boys — are seen as attempts to enforce her otherness." Deborah Young in The Hollywood Reporter says, "Village Rockstars’ storytelling is so offhand it borders on documentary. The action follows natural rhythms, the seasons, biology." Hannah Lynn of Pittsburgh City Paper compared the film to The Florida Project in that it is "aimless without being pointless" while Barry Hertz of The Globe and Mail called it "confident and sincere", giving it 3.5 out of 4 stars. Radheyan Simonpillai of NOW gave the film 4 stars and lamented the fact that the film wasn't nominated at the academy awards, writing that he'd take the "stunning, poetic film [...] over Roma (or Cold War, or Capernaum or Never Look Away) any day."

On review aggregator Rotten Tomatoes, the film holds an approval rating of 93% based on 15 reviews, with an average rating of 7.97/10.

Home Media
The film was also released to Netflix on 20 January 2020.

Awards

Official selection at festivals
 Toronto International Film Festival (Discovery Section) 2017
 San Sebastián International Film Festival (New Directors Competition) 2017
 Guwahati International Film Festival
 Dharamshala International Film Festival (closing film)
 Cannes Film Festival 2017
 Kerala International Film Festival (International Competition) 2017
 SIFFCY 2017 (Opening film)
 Tallinn Black Nights 2017
 HKIFF, Hong Kong International Film Festival 2018
 International Film Festival of India, Goa 2017
 Glasgow Film Festival, UK 2018 (UK premiere)
 Cairo International Film Festival 2017, Egypt
 MAMI Mumbai Film Festival 2017, India
 Medellín International Film Festival 2017, Colombia
 International Children's Film Festival India 2017, India (Competition Section)
 Leiden International Film Festival, Netherlands 2017
 Cork Film Festival 2017, Ireland
 Olympia International Film Festival 2017, Greece (Competition Section)
 Cine Junior Film Festival, France, 2018 (French premiere)
 Les Toiles Filantes, France, 2018
 Cairo International Women's Film Festival, Egypt, 2018
 Aga Khan Museum, Canada, 2018
 Reel 2 Real International Film Festival for Youth, Canada, 2018
 Tromso International Film Festival, Norway, 2018 (Norwegian premiere)
 Göteborg International Film Festival, Sweden, 2018 (Swedish Premiere)
 MOOOV Film Festival, Belgium, 2018 (Belgium premiere)
 Muestra de Cine de Lanzarote, Spain, 2017
 Jogjakarta Film Festival, Indonesia 2017 (South East Asian Premiere)
 Bangalore Film Festival, India
 Chennai International Film Festival, India
 Singapore South Asian International Film Festival 2018

See also
 List of submissions to the 91st Academy Awards for Best Foreign Language Film
 List of Indian submissions for the Academy Award for Best Foreign Language Film

Footnotes

References

External links
 
 

Best Feature Film National Film Award winners
Films whose editor won the Best Film Editing National Award
Films that won the Best Audiography National Film Award
2017 films
2010s Assamese-language films